Elizabeth City State Teachers College Historic District is a national historic district located on the campus of Elizabeth City State University at Elizabeth City, North Carolina. The district encompasses six contributing buildings and one contributing site originally built for the State Colored Normal School at Elizabeth City. The buildings are in the Colonial Revival and Bungalow / American Craftsman architectural styles.

Contributing resources
The district includes:
Campus quadrangle
Principal's House (1921-1923)
Moore Hall (1921-1923, enlarged 1939)
G. R. Little Library, later, Thorpe Administration Building, now H. L. Trigg Building (1937-1939, enlarged, 1959)
Bias Hall (1937-1939)
Butler Hall (c. 1925, enlarged 1939)
Practice School (1921, moved 1957)

It was listed on the National Register of Historic Places in 1994.

Notes

References

University and college buildings on the National Register of Historic Places in North Carolina
Historic districts on the National Register of Historic Places in North Carolina
Colonial Revival architecture in North Carolina
Buildings and structures in Pasquotank County, North Carolina
National Register of Historic Places in Pasquotank County, North Carolina